Princess Lātūfuipeka (Angelika Lātūfuipeka Halaevalu Mataʻaho Napua-o-kalani Tukuʻaho; born 17 November 1983, in Nukuʻalofa) is a Tongan royal and a member of the House of Tupou. Sole daughter of Tupou VI, King of Tonga, Princess Lātūfuipeka became the High Commissioner of Tonga to Australia on 22 August 2012, after her father – High Commissioner until then – succeeded as the King of Tonga.

Family and early life

Family 
She is the sole daughter and eldest child of Tupou VI, King of Tonga and Queen Nanasipau'u. Her middle name is her grandmother's name, Her Late Majesty Queen Mother Halaevalu Mata'aho. She has two brothers, the Crown Prince Tupoutoʻa ʻUlukalala and Prince Ata, who is the youngest. She is in the line of succession to the Tongan throne. The princess will inherit the prestigious title of Princess Royal of Tonga once her paternal aunt, Princess Pilolevu, passes away.

Education 
She was educated at Queen Salote College (Kolofo'ou, Tongatapu, Tonga) and the Tonga Side School. In 2004, she graduated with a Bachelor of Business Administration from Geneva International University, Geneva, Switzerland. The Princess also graduated with a master's degree in Management in 2010 and a follow-on Master's of Business in 2011 at the Australian National University, Canberra, ACT, Australia

Occupation 
The princess worked as administrator at the Tonfön/TV Group of companies (Shoreline Group) from 2004 to 2008. She has held the post of High Commissioner of Tonga to Australia since 22 August 2012.

As of 25 July 2019 she is the Non-Resident Ambassador Extraordinary and Plenipotentiary to the Republic of the Philippines.

Duties 
On 5 of July 2015, she hosted a luncheon in honour for the coronation of her parents at Matakieua Villa which was attended by the Tongan Royal Family, Tongan nobility, members of the Tongan Government, foreign heads of royal houses, foreign royalty and foreign diplomats.

Patronages 
She is Patron of:
 Tonga National Youth Congress (TNYC).
 Tonga Football Association (TFA).
 Tonga National Leadership Development Forum (TNLDF).

She is Member of:

 Young Tongan Traditional Leaders (YTTL).

Honours 
 : Knight Grand Cross with Collar of the Order of Queen Salote Tupou III (KGCCQS)

References 

1983 births
Living people
Tongan princesses
Tongan royalty
High Commissioners of Tonga to Australia
Tongan women diplomats
Women ambassadors
20th-century Tongan people
20th-century Tongan women
21st-century Tongan people
21st-century Tongan women
Daughters of kings